Honcharivske is an urban-type settlement in Chernihiv Raion of Chernihiv Oblast, Ukraine. 1st Armored Brigade and 12th Tank Battalion is stationed in the settlement. It hosts the administration of Honcharivske settlement hromada, one of the hromadas of Ukraine. Population:

gallery

References

Urban-type settlements in Chernihiv Raion